Nocturno may refer to:

 Nocturno (Anggun album), 1992
 Nocturno (Roy Brown album), 1991
 Nocturno (XIII. Století album), a 2010 album by XIII. Století
 Nocturno (Enja Records), 2016

See also 
 Nocturne (disambiguation)